"Swing My Way" is a hip-hop song by American duo K.P. & Envyi. For each of them, it is their only top 40 hit, reaching No. 6 on the Billboard Hot 100 for the week ending March 14, 1998. It entered the Hot 100 on the week ending December 27, 1997, at No. 86.

Since the release of "Swing My Way", a few of the people who worked behind the scenes went on to have success on their own. Atlanta rapper Ludacris penned the verses for the remix version of the song. The background singer Algebra Blessett emerged as a neo-soul singer a decade after her appearance. Mixzo went on to produce for artists like Fiend, Juvenile, Lil Wayne, Aaliyah, Ludacris, and Maxwell. The producer of the remix, Carl Mo, became best known for his production of the 2003 OutKast song "The Way You Move". American singer Bryson Tiller sampled the song in his hit track "Exchange", and American rapper J. Cole sampled the song in his song "Deja Vu". Lastly, a young Polow Da Don was featured in the music video, which was directed by visual artist and designer Ron Norsworthy.

Charts and certifications

Weekly charts

Year-end charts

Certifications

|}

Personnel
 K.P. - performer
 Envyi - performer, background vocals
 Mixzo - producer
 Michael O. Johnson - writer
 Javalyn Hall-Johnson - writer
 Algebra Blessett - background vocals
 Randell Rivers - Lead guitar
 Mike Wilson - recording engineer
 Neal H. Pogue - mixing

Remix
 Carl Mo - additional production, vocal arrangement, music
 Christopher Bridges - writer
 Craig Love - additional acoustic guitar
 Emperor Searcy - scratches

References

1997 singles
1997 songs
East West Records singles
Elektra Records singles